Welcome Home, Loser is the second full-length album by British group The Broken Family Band. It was released in 2005 by the Track & Field Organisation.

Track listing
Happy Days Are Here Again – 2:54
Living in Sin – 3:10
O Princess – 3:15
Where the Hell Is My Baby? – 3:43
Yer Little Bedroom – 5:19
John Belushi (Adams, Williams) – 4:18
Cocktail Lounge – 3:10
Honest Man's Blues – 2:08
We Already Said Goodbye – 3:43
A Place You Deserve (Adams) – 3:32
Roman Johnson One 	(Johnson, Roman) – 0:36
The Last Song – 3:43
Wherever You Go – 3:12
Coping with Fear (Adams, Williams) – 6:00

All songs written by Adams/Broken Family Band, except where noted

Credits
Steven Adams – guitar, vocals
Gavin Johnson – bass guitar
Micky Roman – drums
Jay Williams – guitar
Timothy Victor – banjo, vocals
Owen, Stacy and Andrew

2005 albums
The Broken Family Band albums